This is a list of articles relating to Bavaria. It does not include articles which are already properly listed within other articles included below; such as towns and cities.

Please add any missing, relevant articles of which you are aware.

Culture
Culture of Bavaria

Art
Celtic art
List of theatres in Bavaria
List of theatres in Munich
Migration Period art

Language
Austro-Bavarian German
Alemannic German
East Franconian German

National symbols and icons
Coat of arms of Bavaria
Flag of Bavaria
Bayernhymne
Bavaria statue
Coat of arms of Munich
Münchner Kindl

Bavarian people
Bavarian people

Geography and Demographics
List of places in Bavaria
List of rivers of Bavaria

History
History of Bavaria
Bavarian Army

Government and politics
Politics of Bavaria:
List of Premiers of Bavaria
Bavaria state election, 2008
Landtag of Bavaria

See also

Lists of country-related topicssimilar lists for other countries

Bavaria